U-JIN Tech Corp. is a South Korean manufacturer of friction welding machines and automated manufacturing cells.

History 
U-JIN Tech Corp. was founded in February 2009. It obtained ISO 9001:2008 certification and established its own R&D center within the Korea Industrial Technology Association (KOITA) in 2010. The R&D center has the objective to develop new products to deliver innovative products.

U-JIN Tech Corp. won the Small and Medium Company Technological Innovation Award and the Excellent Award in Manufacture and Technology of Gyeonggi-do Green Industry Awards by the Governor of Gyeonggi-do in 2012. U-Jin has initially developed and manufactured hydraulic friction welding machines, and it built Korea's first CNC friction welding machine in 2012. The rapid growth is based on the development of technologies that meet the needs of its customers.

In 2015 the company was recognized as Contributor for Development of Excellent Capital Goods by the Minister of Trade, Industry, and Energy. In November 2016 it received the European CE Certificate and started exporting machines to Europe. On Trade Day in December 2016, it received the 10 Million Dollar Export Tower Award.

Friction welding machines 
State-of-the-art CNC technology is used by U-JIN Tech Corp both for automatic material transport and in cases where high accuracy is required. Due to the position measuring devices known from CNC milling machines, the length tolerance of the components can be maintained more accurately than with conventional hydraulic machines. It is even possible, to bring the spindle to a standstill in a given position so that the two eyes of a drive shaft can be positioned at an angle to each other.
 
The two spindles of U-JIN's computer numerical controlled double-head friction welding machines are driven by servo motors that allow the angular position of their motor shaft to be controlled, as well as the speed of rotation and acceleration, since they are equipped with position sensors. If the spindles are controlled in the same way as CNC-controlled servo motors, angular accuracies of ±0.5° can be achieved, e.g. at both ends of a cardan shaft.

Friction welded products 

As friction welding operates below the melting point of the materials, even dissimilar material joints can be produced with high tensile strength. In many cases, the tensile strength of the bimetallic joint is higher than that of the softer base material.

U-JIN's friction welding machines are used industrially for a wide variety of products:
 
Gear shafts made of chrome-molybdenum steel
Electric terminals and cable lugs made of pure copper and pure aluminum
Long screws and bolts made of structural or high-speed steel
Stainless steel and aluminum adapters for refrigerants or coolants in superconductors
Shaft-hub connections in hollow shafts for the drive train of cars
Carbon steel (Advanced High Strength Steel, AHSS) and stainless steel pump shafts
Transition pieces in carbon steel S25C and stainless steel SUS304 (tensile strength 443 N/mm²)
Transition pieces made of carbon steel S45C and stainless steel SUS304 (tensile strength 639 N/mm²)
Motor shafts made of structural and stainless steel

External links

References 

Industrial machine manufacturers
Manufacturing companies established in 2009
Engineering companies of South Korea
South Korean brands